The Boardman Lake Trail (colloquially referred to as the "BLT") is a  recreational trail in Traverse City, Michigan. Established in 2005 and completed in 2022, the trail encircles Boardman Lake, and features a number of bridges over the lake and Boardman River. The trail connects to and is part of the TART Trail system.

See also 

 List of rail trails in Michigan

References

Hiking trails in Michigan